is a Japanese former cyclist. He competed in the team pursuit event at the 1976 Summer Olympics. He was also a professional keirin cyclist.

References

External links
 

1954 births
Living people
Japanese male cyclists
Olympic cyclists of Japan
Cyclists at the 1976 Summer Olympics
Place of birth missing (living people)
Keirin cyclists